Tarrah may refer to:
Tarrah-e Yek, a village in Iran
Tarrah-e Do, a village in Iran
Tarrah Rural District, an administrative subdivision of Iran
Tarrah Harvey (b. 1989), Canadian ice dancer